Hydriris aonisalis is a moth in the family Crambidae. It is found on Borneo.

References

Moths described in 1859
Spilomelinae
Moths of Borneo